William Merrill Polk (born July 26, 1935) is an American former politician in the state of Washington. He served in the Washington House of Representatives as a Republican. He is also a former Speaker of the Washington House of Representatives.

In 1968, William Polk FAIA, started as a partner at a Seattle architectural firm which became Waldron Pomeroy Polk & Smith in 1975. Bill started his own practice as William Polk Associates in 1985 after spending 4 years as the Chief Operating Officer at the John Graham Company. He joined INNOVA Architects in 2011. He was the Principal in charge of the Seattle Office in Mercer Island.

References

Living people
1936 births
Speakers of the Washington House of Representatives
Republican Party members of the Washington House of Representatives
People from Cleburne, Texas
Architects from Texas
Architects from Washington (state)